This is a list of kings of Dos Pilas, a Pre-Columbian site of the Maya civilization located in what is now the department of Petén, Guatemala.

This is also a list of Dos Pilas consorts.

Notes

References

External links
Bajlaj Chan K'awiil at Mesoweb
Itzamnaaj K'awiil of Dos Pilas at Mesoweb
Dos Pilas Ruler 3 at Mesoweb
K'awiil Chan K'inich

Dos Pilas